Object recognition – technology in the field of computer vision for finding and identifying objects in an image or video sequence. Humans recognize a multitude of objects in images with little effort, despite the fact that the image of the objects may vary somewhat in different view points, in many different sizes and scales or even when they are translated or rotated. Objects can even be recognized when they are partially obstructed from view. This task is still a challenge for computer vision systems. Many approaches to the task have been implemented over multiple decades.

Approaches based on CAD-like object models 

 Edge detection
 Primal sketch
 Marr, Mohan and Nevatia
 Lowe
 Olivier Faugeras

Recognition by parts 

 Generalized cylinders (Thomas Binford)
 Geons (Irving Biederman)
 Dickinson, Forsyth and Ponce

Appearance-based methods 

 Use example images (called templates or exemplars) of the objects to perform recognition
 Objects look different under varying conditions:
 Changes in lighting or color
 Changes in viewing direction
 Changes in size/shape
 A single exemplar is unlikely to succeed reliably. However, it is impossible to represent all appearances of an object.

Edge matching 

 Uses edge detection techniques, such as the Canny edge detection, to find edges.
 Changes in lighting and color usually don't have much effect on image edges
 Strategy:
 Detect edges in template and image
 Compare edges images to find the template
 Must consider range of possible template positions
 Measurements:
 Good –  count the number of overlapping edges. Not robust to changes in shape
 Better – count the number of template edge pixels with some distance of an edge in the search image
 Best –  determine probability distribution of distance to nearest edge in search image (if template at correct position). Estimate likelihood of each template position generating image

Divide-and-Conquer search 

 Strategy:
 Consider all positions as a set (a cell in the space of positions)
 Determine lower bound on score at best position in cell
 If bound is too large, prune cell
 If bound is not too large, divide cell into subcells and try each subcell recursively
 Process stops when cell is “small enough”
 Unlike multi-resolution search, this technique is guaranteed to find all matches that meet the criterion (assuming that the lower bound is accurate)
 Finding the Bound:
 To find the lower bound on the best score, look at score for the template position represented by the center of the cell
 Subtract maximum change from the “center” position for any other position in cell (occurs at cell corners)
 Complexities arise from determining bounds on distance

Greyscale matching 

 Edges are (mostly) robust to illumination changes, however they throw away a lot of information
 Must compute pixel distance as a function of both pixel position and pixel intensity
 Can be applied to color also

Gradient matching 

 Another way to be robust to illumination changes without throwing away as much information is to compare image gradients
 Matching is performed like matching greyscale images
 Simple alternative: Use (normalized) correlation

Histograms of receptive field responses 

     Avoids explicit point correspondences
     Relations between different image points implicitly coded in the receptive field responses
     Swain and Ballard (1991), Schiele and Crowley (2000), Linde and Lindeberg (2004, 2012)

Large modelbases 

 One approach to efficiently searching the database for a specific image to use eigenvectors of the templates (called eigenfaces)
 Modelbases are a collection of geometric models of the objects that should be recognized

Feature-based methods 

 a search is used to find feasible matches between object features and image features.
 the primary constraint is that a single position of the object must account for all of the feasible matches.
 methods that extract features from the objects to be recognized and the images to be searched.
 surface patches
 corners
 linear edges

Interpretation trees 

 A method for searching for feasible matches, is to search through a tree.
 Each node in the tree represents a set of matches.
 Root node represents empty set
 Each other node is the union of the matches in the parent node and one additional match.
 Wildcard is used for features with no match
 Nodes are “pruned” when the set of matches is infeasible.
 A pruned node has no children
 Historically significant and still used, but less commonly

Hypothesize and test 

 General Idea:
 Hypothesize a correspondence between a collection of image features and a collection of object features
 Then use this to generate a hypothesis about the projection from the object coordinate frame to the image frame
 Use this projection hypothesis to generate a rendering of the object. This step is usually known as backprojection
 Compare the rendering to the image, and, if the two are sufficiently similar, accept the hypothesis
 Obtaining Hypothesis:
 There are a variety of different ways of generating hypotheses.
 When camera intrinsic parameters are known, the hypothesis is equivalent to a hypothetical position and orientation – pose – for the object.
 Utilize geometric constraints
 Construct a correspondence for small sets of object features to every correctly sized subset of image points. (These are the hypotheses)
 Three basic approaches:
 Obtaining Hypotheses by Pose Consistency
 Obtaining Hypotheses by Pose Clustering
 Obtaining Hypotheses by Using Invariants
 Expense search that is also redundant, but can be improved using Randomization and/or Grouping
 Randomization
 Examining small sets of image features until likelihood of missing object becomes small
 For each set of image features, all possible matching sets of model features must be considered.
 Formula:
 ( 1 – Wc)k = Z
 W =  the fraction of image points that are “good” (w ~ m/n)
 c =  the number of correspondences necessary
 k =  the number of trials
 Z =  the probability of every trial using one (or more) incorrect correspondences
 Grouping
 If we can determine groups of points that are likely to come from the same object, we can reduce the number of hypotheses that need to be examined

Pose consistency 

 Also called Alignment, since the object is being aligned to the image
 Correspondences between image features and model features are not independent – Geometric constraints
 A small number of correspondences yields the object position – the others must be consistent with this
 General Idea:
 If we hypothesize a match between a sufficiently large group of image features and a sufficiently large group of object features, then we can recover the missing camera parameters from this hypothesis (and so render the rest of the object)
 Strategy:
 Generate hypotheses using small number of correspondences (e.g. triples of points for 3D recognition)
 Project other model features into image (backproject) and verify additional correspondences
 Use the smallest number of correspondences necessary to achieve discrete object poses

Pose clustering 

 General Idea:
 Each object leads to many correct sets of correspondences, each of which has (roughly) the same pose
 Vote on pose. Use an accumulator array that represents pose space for each object
 This is essentially a Hough transform
 Strategy:
 For each object, set up an accumulator array that represents pose space – each element in the accumulator array corresponds to a “bucket” in pose space.
 Then take each image frame group, and hypothesize a correspondence between it and every frame group on every object
 For each of these correspondences, determine pose parameters and make an entry in the accumulator array for the current object at the pose value.
 If there are large numbers of votes in any object's accumulator array, this can be interpreted as evidence for the presence of that object at that pose.
 The evidence can be checked using a verification method
 Note that this method uses sets of correspondences, rather than individual correspondences
 Implementation is easier, since each set yields a small number of possible object poses.
 Improvement
 The noise resistance of this method can be improved by not counting votes for objects at poses where the vote is obviously unreliable
 § For example, in cases where, if the object was at that pose, the object frame group would be invisible.
 These improvements are sufficient to yield working systems

Invariance 

 There are geometric properties that are invariant to camera transformations
 Most easily developed for images of planar objects, but can be applied to other cases as well

Geometric hashing 

 An algorithm that uses geometric invariants to vote for object hypotheses
 Similar to pose clustering, however instead of voting on pose, we are now voting on geometry
 A technique originally developed for matching geometric features (uncalibrated affine views of plane models) against a database of such features
 Widely used for pattern-matching, CAD/CAM, and medical imaging.
 It is difficult to choose the size of the buckets
 It is hard to be sure what “enough” means. Therefore, there may be some danger that the table will get clogged.

Scale-invariant feature transform (SIFT) 

 Keypoints of objects are first extracted from a set of reference images and stored in a database
 An object is recognized in a new image by individually comparing each feature from the new image to this database and finding candidate matching features based on Euclidean distance of their feature vectors.
     Lowe (2004)

Speeded Up Robust Features (SURF) 

 A robust image detector & descriptor
 The standard version is several times faster than SIFT and claimed by its authors to be more robust against different image transformations than SIFT
 Based on sums of approximated 2D Haar wavelet responses and made efficient use of integral images.
 Bay et al. (2008)

Bag of words representations

Genetic algorithm
Genetic algorithms can operate without prior knowledge of a given dataset and can develop recognition procedures without human intervention. A recent project achieved 100 percent accuracy on the benchmark motorbike, face, airplane and car image datasets from Caltech and 99.4 percent accuracy on fish species image datasets.

Other approaches 

 3D object recognition and reconstruction
 Biologically inspired object recognition
 Artificial neural networks and Deep Learning especially convolutional neural networks
 Context
 Explicit and implicit 3D object models
 Fast indexing
 Global scene representations
 Gradient histograms
 Stochastic grammars
 Intraclass transfer learning
 Object categorization from image search
 Reflectance
 Shape-from-shading
 Template matching
 Texture
 Topic models
 Unsupervised learning
 Window-based detection
 Deformable Part Model
 Bingham distribution

Applications 

Object recognition methods has the following applications:
 Activity recognition
 Automatic image annotation
 Automatic target recognition
 Android Eyes - Object Recognition
 Computer-aided diagnosis
 Image panoramas
 Image watermarking
 Global robot localization
 Face detection
 Optical Character Recognition
 Manufacturing quality control
 Content-based image retrieval
 Object Counting and Monitoring
 Automated parking systems
 Visual Positioning and tracking
 Video stabilization
 Pedestrian detection
 Intelligent speed assistance (in car and other vehicles)

Surveys 
Daniilides and Eklundh, Edelman.

See also 

 Histogram of oriented gradients
 Convolutional neural network
 OpenCV
 Scale-invariant feature transform (SIFT)
 Object detection
 Scholarpedia article on scale-invariant feature transform and related object recognition methods
 SURF
 Template matching
Integral channel feature

 Lists
 List of computer vision topics
 List of emerging technologies
 Outline of artificial intelligence

Notes

References 

 Elgammal, Ahmed  "CS 534: Computer Vision 3D Model-based recognition",  Dept of Computer Science, Rutgers University;
 Hartley, Richard and Zisserman, Andrew  "Multiple View Geometry in computer vision", Cambridge Press, 2000, .
 Roth, Peter M. and Winter, Martin  "Survey of Appearance-Based Methods for Object Recognition",  Technical Report ICG-TR-01/08, Inst. for Computer Graphics and Vision, Graz University of Technology, Austria;  January 15, 2008.
 Collins, Robert  "Lecture 31: Object Recognition: SIFT Keys",  CSE486, Penn State
  IPRG Image Processing - Online Open Research Group
 Christian Szegedy, Alexander Toshev and Dumitru Erhan. Deep Neural Networks for Object Detection. Advances in Neural Information Processing Systems 26, 2013. page 2553–2561.

External links 

Object recognition
Object recognition